The New York Dutch, also known simply as Dutchmen (Dutch: Duitsers), were a cultural group native to New York and New Jersey found along the old borders of New Netherland. In New York they were known as the New York Dutch, and in New Jersey as the Jersey Dutch. The Pennsylvania Dutch are culturally related to the New York Dutch, and many Pennsylvania Dutchmen have New York Dutch ancestry.

The ancestors of the New York & Jersey Dutch are the New Netherlanders, the settlers of New Netherland.

Although Low Dutch speakers comprised the majority of the New York Dutch, they also included High Dutch speakers, the Palatine Dutch (Pälzer) of the Rhenish Palatinate.

Etymology 

Dutch in the English language originally referred to all Germanic language speakers. The English settlers referred to the Dutch language spoken by the Knickerbocker Dutch of New York and New Jersey as Low Dutch (Dutch: laagduits), and the Dutch language spoken by the Palatine Dutch in Pennsylvania & New York as High Dutch (German: hochdeutsch). Below is a quote from the Boston Gazette on October 8, 1795, mentioning a speaker of high and low Dutch:

The term "Knickerbockers" comes from a name assumed by Washington Irving in writing his work "Knickerbocker's history of New York", published in 1809. The title was used as an advertising scheme to announce the book, and since then the descendants of the Dutch in New York have been called "Knickerbockers."

Knickerbocker, or "knickers" refers to the breeches that the Dutch settlers would wear at their knee level.

History

Early History 

In 1602, the Dutch government chartered the Dutch East India Company (Vereenigde Oostindische Compagnie, VOC). It sent explorers under the command of Henry Hudson, who arrived in 1609 and mapped what is now known as the Hudson River. Their initial goal was to find an alternative route to Asia, but they found good farmland and plenty of wildlife instead.

Oldest Dutch settlement 

The earliest Dutch settlement was built around 1613; it consisted of a number of small huts built by the crew of the Tijger (Tiger), a Dutch ship under the command of Captain Adriaen Block which had caught fire while sailing on the Hudson in the winter of 1613. The ship was lost and Block and his crew established a camp ashore. In the spring, Block and his men did some explorations along the coast of Long Island. Block Island still bears his name. Finally, they were sighted and rescued by another Dutch ship and the settlement was abandoned.

17th-century migration 
Dutch trade in the New York area led to the establishment of trade posts as early as 1613. Permanent settlers arrived in 1617 at what is now Albany, New York. New Amsterdam was settled in 1625. In 1629, Dutch officials tried to expand the northern colony through a plan that promised "Liberties and Exemptions" to anyone who would ship fifty colonists to America at his own expense. Anyone who did so would be allowed to buy a stretch of land along the Hudson River from the Dutch West India Company of about twelve miles, extending as far inland as the owner wanted. The landowners were called patroons and had complete jurisdiction over their domains as well as extensive trading privileges. They also received these rights in perpetuity. That was a form of feudalism, which had vanished in the Dutch Republic but was introduced in North America. The Patroonships were not a success; by 1635, the Dutch West India Company had bought back four of the five patroonships originally registered in Amsterdam.

The Native Americans were no longer consulted or offered/asked to sell their lands. The Dutch were confronted with a new phenomenon, Native American raids, since the local tribes had now realized that the Dutch were not simply visitors but people set to settle their land.

The Dutch realized that they had gone with the wrong approach as they offered great privileges to wealthy, not poor, citizens. It was not until 1656 that the Dutch state abandoned its passivity and decided to actively support New Netherland. The Dutch state issued a proclamation, which stated that "all mechanics and farmers who can prove their ability to earn a living here shall receive free passage for themselves, their wives and children".

Although the Dutch were in control, only about half the settlers were ethnically Dutch (the other half consisted mainly of Walloons, Palatines, and French Huguenots as well as New England Yankees). Manhattan grew increasingly multicultural. In 1664, the English seized the colony and renamed it New York. The Dutch briefly recaptured the colony in 1673, but during peace talks with the English, they decided to trade it in 1674 for Suriname in South America, which was more profitable.

18th century 

In the hundred years of British rule that followed the change of ownership of New Netherland, Dutch immigration to America came to an almost complete standstill.

While the Netherlands was a small country, the Dutch Empire was quite large so emigrants leaving the mother country had a wide variety of choices. New Amsterdam was not high on their list, especially because of the Native American risk. The major Dutch cities were centers of high culture, but they still sent immigrants. Most new arrivals were farmers from remote villages who, on arrival, in America scattered into widely separated villages with little contact with one another. Even inside a settlement, different Dutch groups had minimal interaction. With very few new arrivals, the result was an increasingly traditional system cut off from the forces for change. The people maintained their popular culture, revolving around their language and their Calvinist religion. The Dutch brought along their own folklore, most famously Sinterklaas (the foundation of the modern-day Santa Claus) and created their own as in The Legend of Sleepy Hollow. They maintained their distinctive clothing, and food preferences and introduced some new foods to America, including beets, endive, spinach, parsley, and cookies.

After the English takeover, the rich Dutch families in Albany and New York City emulated the English elite and purchased English furniture, silverware, crystal, and jewelry. They were proud of their language, which was strongly reinforced by the church, but they were much slower than the Yankees in setting up schools for their children. They finally set up Queens College (now Rutgers University) in New Jersey, but it quickly became anglicized. They never attempted to start newspapers; they published no books and only a handful of religious tracts annually. Pietist leader Theodorus Jacobus Frelinghuysen (1691–1747) launched a series of revivals that challenge the mainstream church's emphasis on sacraments. Church buildings increasingly followed English rather than historic Dutch models. Politically, however, there was a strong anti-British sentiment that led most of the Dutch to support the American Revolution. One famous Dutch folk hero was Rip Van Winkle, characterized by being absurdly old-fashioned and out of date, which aimed to instill the establishment of an American culture distinct from British culture. Most farmers focused on providing subsistence for their families; about a third were chiefly oriented to market prices.

Dutch Quakers came to the Philadelphia area in response to the appeal of William Penn. Penn, himself a Dutch Briton (his mother being from Rotterdam), had paid three visits to the Netherlands, where he published several pamphlets.

Palatine Dutch of New York 

The Palatine Dutch had trickled into British America since their earliest days. The first mass migration, however, began in 1708. Queen Anne's government had sympathy for the Palatines and had invited them to go to America and work in trade for passage. Official correspondence in British records shows a combined total of 13,146 refugees traveled down the Rhine and or from Amsterdam to England in the summer of 1709. More than 3500 of these were returned from England either because they were Roman Catholic or at their own request. Henry Z Jones, Jr. quotes an entry in a churchbook by the Pastor of Dreieichenhain that states a total of 15,313 Palatines left their villages in 1709 "for the so-called New America and, of course, Carolina".

The flood of immigration overwhelmed English resources. It resulted in major disruptions, overcrowding, famine, disease and the death of a thousand or more Palatines. It appeared the entire Palatinate would be emptied before a halt could be called to emigration. Many reasons have been given to explain why so many families left their homes for an unknown land. Knittle summarizes them: "(1) war devastation, (2) heavy taxation, (3) an extraordinarily severe winter, (4) religious quarrels, but not persecutions, (5) land hunger on the part of the elderly and desire for adventure on the part of the young, (6) liberal advertising by colonial proprietors, and finally (7) the benevolent and active cooperation of the British government."

Palatine and Indian Relationship

Preston wrote that the popular stereotype of United States frontier relations between white settler colonists and Native Americans as being from two racial worlds that hardly interacted did not apply to the Palatine-Iroquois relationship, writing that the Palatines lived between Iroquois settlements in Kanienkeh, and the two peoples "communicated, drank, worked, worshipped and traded together, negotiated over land use and borders, and conducted their diplomacy separate from the colonial governments". Some Palatines learned to perform the Haudenosaunee condolence ceremony, where condolences were offered to those whose friends and family had died, which was the most important of all Iroquois rituals. The Canadian historian James Paxton wrote the Palatines and Haudenosaunee "visited each other's homes, conducted small-scale trade and socialized in taverns and trading posts".

Unlike the frontier in Pennsylvania and in the Ohio river valley, where English settlers and the Indians had bloodstained relations, leading to hundreds of murders, relations between the Palatine Dutch and Indians in Kanienkeh were friendly. Between 1756 and 1774 in the New York frontier, only 5 colonists or British soldiers were killed by Native Americans, while just 6 Natives were killed by soldiers or settlers. The New York frontier had no equivalent to the Paxton Boys, a vigilante group of Scots-Irish settlers on the Pennsylvania frontier who waged a near-genocidal campaign against the Susquehannock Indians in 1763–64, and the news of the killing perpetrated by the Paxton Boys was received with horror by both whites and Indians on the New York frontier.

However, the Iroquois had initially allowed the Palatines to settle in Kanienkeh out of sympathy for their poverty, and expected them to ultimately contribute for being allowed to live on the land when they become wealthier. In a letter to Sir William Johnson, the Superintendent of Northern Indian Affairs, in 1756, Oneida sachems and clan mothers complained that they had allowed the Palatines to settle in Kanienkeh out of "compassion to their poverty and expected when they could afford it that they would pay us for their land", going on to write now that the Palatines had "grown rich they not only refuse to pay us for our land, but impose on us in everything we have to do with them". Likewise, many Iroquois sachems and clan mothers complained that their young people were too fond of drinking the beer brewed by the Palatines, charging that alcohol was a destructive force in their community.

Last speakers of New York Dutch 

The last native speakers of New York Dutch were born between 1860 and 1880, and until the 1960s there were elderly people who still spoke the language.

Notes

Dutch-American culture in New Jersey